Cynohyaenodon ("dog-like Hyaenodon") is an extinct paraphyletic genus of hyaenodontid mammals from family Hyaenodontidae that lived during the early to middle Eocene in Europe.

Phylogeny 
The phylogenetic relationships of genus Cynohyaenodon are shown in the following cladogram.

See also 
 Mammal classification
 Hyaenodontidae

References 

Hyaenodonts
Eocene mammals
Fossils of France
Prehistoric placental genera